Mihanikos (Greek: Ο χορός του Μηχανικού, literally The dance of the mechanic) is a traditional dance from the Greek island of Kalymnos. It is typically only performed by men dancing in a line. In basic it is a normal Syrtos.

The dance depicts the crippling effects of decompression sickness caused by sponge diving, which was the main source of income on Kalymnos during the last half of the 19th century. This is shown by the leading dancer who (on the slow part of the music) seemingly has to struggle to stand and walk, and uses a stick in doing so. His feet and legs shake violently and sometimes he almost collapses. This "mechanic" behaviour gives the dance its name. Sometimes he is seen being assisted by the second dancer in line. The other dancers dance on normally, until at some point the music picks up speed and leading dancer picks up the rhythm and they dance together in line, with the leading dancer joyfully showing off. This may happen only once during the dance, or the slow and fast parts may alternate, with or without the leading dancer joining the line.

See also

Greek folk music
Greek dances

References

Greek dances
Greek music
Kalymnos